Mahasoa Est is a rural municipality in Madagascar. It belongs to the district of Betroka, which is a part of Anosy Region. It has a population of 8126 inhabitants (2018).

Only primary schooling is available. Farming and raising livestock provides employment for 48% and 49% of the working population. The most important crops are rice and cassava, while other important agricultural products are maize and onions. Services provide employment for 2% of the population. Additionally fishing employs 1% of the population.

References 

Populated places in Anosy